Richard St Clair Johnson (6 June 1929 – 31 August 2019) was a former academic and senior Australian public servant.

Background and early life
Dick Johnson was born in Singapore, one of four children born to Australian parents. His father worked in the insurance industry in Asia.  He attended secondary schooling at the Jesuit Riverview College. In 1946 Johnson began a double honours degree in Greek and Latin at the University of Sydney.

Career
Johnson was Professor of Classics at the Australian National University from 1962 to 1984. In his first year in the role, he established the Australian National University Classics Museum so that Canberra students could learn about ancient Greek and Roman objects.

In April 1984, Johnson was appointed Secretary of the Department of Education (later, Education and Youth Affairs). He left his role in January 1985, succeeded by Helen Williams, the first woman to become a departmental secretary in the Australian Government.

References

Secretaries of the Australian Government Education Department

1929 births
2019 deaths